Netravali is a census town in Sanguem taluka, South Goa district in the state of Goa, India.

Netravali Wildlife Sanctuary

Located in Sanguem Taluka in Eastern Goa.
Area : 211.05 km2
Major attractions : black panther, giant squirrel, slender loris, great pied hornbills
Best time to visit : October to March

If you are a wildlife lover and have explored the three main wildlife sanctuaries of Goa, do not think that your wildlife trip has been completed. This is because there is also a new wildlife sanctuary which deserve a visit. Situated in Eastern Goa, Netravali Wildlife Sanctuary is a major attraction for nature-enthusiasts and wildlife lovers as well. Just few years back Netravali was declared a wildlife sanctuary by the government of Goa to protect its Western Ghat range. Netravali is connected to the Madei Wildlife Sanctuary and together the two parks cover an area of 420 km2, of which Netravali has 211.05 km2 area. The Netravali Wildlife Sanctuary lies between the Bhagwan Mahavir Wildlife Sanctuary to its north and Cotigao Wildlife Sanctuary to its south.

Flora
Not only the wildlife, variety of forest in Netravali deserve tourist appreciation also. Netravali has moist-deciduous forest interspersed with semi-evergreen and evergreen forests.

Fauna
Here, you can spot wildlife like black panthers, great pied hornbills, king cobras, giant squirrels, slender loris. Apart from these wildlife species, you can also see a number of other animals also.

Where to stay
Accommodation is available in forest rest houses run by the GTDC (Goa Tourism Development Corporation).

How to reach
Dabolim airport is 65 km away from the Netravali Wildlife Sanctuary. From the airport, you have to hire taxis to reach the sanctuary. Margao (45 km) one of the major railway stations of Goa, is the nearest railhead. Buses and taxis are available from Margao and Panaji (75 km) to Netravali Wildlife Sanctuary.

Savari Waterfall
Located in Sanguem Taluka in Eastern Goa.
Major attractions: waterfall, jungle walk, mountain climbing
Best time to visit: Any time during the year (preferably summer to get relief from the heat).

If you are adventurous enough, you have the zeal to walk the distance, no fear of the wild animals, this is the destination you can have fun and enjoy. Filled with greenery, the animals sound on the way make the journey more beautiful. And do not be surprised if you start shouting just to listen to your own voice.

Safety
There is a danger of wild animals attacking, but no incidents have been reported.

Responsibility
You are responsible to keep the environment safe. Do not light fire. Throw the waste at once place only. Do not pollute the place.

Mainapi Waterfall
Mainapi is the smaller of the two waterfalls at Netravali, more pristine and secluded. A trek of about 2 hours takes you to the falls (the last half an hour or so of which gets quite steep and tricky). You can stand under the cascading falls, swim in the pools of water at its base, and maybe even have a little picnic lunch on the rocks.

See also
Netravali Wildlife Sanctuary

References

Cities and towns in South Goa district
Villages in South Goa district